Kaputa District is a district of Zambia, located in Northern Province. The capital lies at Kaputa. As of the 2000 Zambian Census, the district had a population of 87,233 people.

History 
In March 2020, the district experienced severe flooding at Mofwe crossing point on the Mporokoso to Mununga road.

Infrastructure

Education 
In May 2017, Kaputa Boarding Secondary School built for an estimated ZMW 44 million (US$ 4.6 million) was opened to cater for 392 pupils.

Utilities 
In April 2022, the Kaputa Water and Sanitation Project built for ZMW 161 million (US$ 9.5 million) by Tomorrow Investments Limited was commissioned by the Country's Vice President Mutale Nalumango for improved access to clean and safe water supply for the residents in the district.

Economy

Agriculture 
In 2020, farmers in Kaputa cultivated 2,362 hectares of rice with a yield of 2,347 metric tonnes. The Ministry of Agriculture in Kaputa has estimated that over 2,800 hectares of rice has been cultivated for the 2020 farming season.

References

Districts of Northern Province, Zambia